VOLAG, sometimes spelled Volag or VolAg, is an abbreviation for "Voluntary Agency". This term refers to any of the nine U.S. private agencies and one state agency that have cooperative agreements with the State Department to provide reception and placement services for refugees arriving in the United States. These agencies use funding from the State Department's Bureau of Population, Refugees, and Migration (PRM) along with self-generated resources to provide refugees with a range of services including sponsorship, initial housing, food and clothing, orientation and counseling. VOLAGs may also contract with the Office of Refugee Resettlement (part of the U.S. Department of Health and Human Services) to provide job placement, English language training and other social services. Each of the nine voluntary agencies recognized by the federal government vary significantly in their history, experience, size, denominational affiliation, philosophy, primary clientele, administrative structure, resettlement capacity, and institutionalized resettlement. Of the nine U.S. private agencies, all of them are religiously affiliated or faith-based with the exception of the International Rescue Committee.

History 
Following the end of World War II, President Harry S. Truman issued the Corporate Affidavit Program of 1946 to speed up the admission of thousands of persons displaced by the war. The corporate affidavit guarantees that the U.S. federal government provide financial support to voluntary agencies, ultimately ensuring that displaced persons would not become public charges. Under the Displaced Persons Act of 1948, responsibility for resettling displaced persons was assigned to voluntary agencies and state commissions. The significant influx of Cuban refugees fleeing Fidel Castro's Cuba in the 1960s furthered the partnership between VOLAGs and the federal government. Voluntary agencies initially used private resources, generated by private and public donations, to address the elevated number of Cuban refugees. As a response, in December 1960, President Dwight D. Eisenhower established the Cuban Refugee Emergency Center in Miami and contracted with four voluntary agencies: National Catholic Welfare Conference, Church World Service, International Rescue Committee, and United HIAS Service, providing them with federal funds to assist with their resettlement services. In 1961, President Kennedy implemented a program within the United States Department of Health, Education and Welfare to provide federally funded assistance to Cuban refugees as well as resettlement contracts with the voluntary agencies. In 1978, the passage of a new domestic assistance program, titled the "Soviet and other" refugee program, provided funds to voluntary agencies on a fifty-fifty matching basis, ensuring that refugees not covered by the existing Cuban and Southeast Asian programs would be able to access aid. The Refugee Act of 1980, which established the Office of Refugee Resettlement within the United States Department of Health and Human Services, developed a comprehensive program for domestic refugee resettlement, pinpointing voluntary agencies as a necessary and needed entity for refugee resettlement in the United States. The Office of Refugee Resettlement is currently examining the role of the voluntary agencies in domestic refugee resettlement and is attempting to more clearly define the complex relationship between the VOLAGs and the federal, state, and local governments.

Funding 
Newly-arriving refugees are particularly dependent upon the services of voluntary agencies, especially those who do not have family already living in the United States. According to a 2006 study focused on the role of faith-based refugee resettlement agencies, resettlement agency staff have consistently expressed concern and frustration surrounding the lack of federal funding for voluntary agencies, explicitly stating that the amount of funding provided is not adequate to address the needs of their clients. The U.S. Department of State requires voluntary agencies to conduct a cost analysis of their refugee resettlement services to assess their monetary needs and discern the annual amount of funding that will be provided. A 2008 study conducted by Lutheran Immigration and Refugee Service explained that the federal contributions provided by the U.S. Department of State had provided $850 per-person funding to the organization which, after calculating the actual expenses associated with providing refugee clients with basic needs, cultural orientation, and case management, amounted to only 39 percent of the total cost accrued. The remaining funds were covered by private and public donations, volunteer hours, and direct contributions from affiliate agencies.

The U.S. Senate Committee on Foreign Relations released a report in 2010 criticizing the governmental failure to increase federal funding in order to meet the needs of newly-arriving refugees, stating that ‘the decades-old grant level had declined by more than 50 percent in real terms due to inflation’.

List of VOLAGs
Church World Service
Episcopal Migration Ministries
Ethiopian Community Development Council
HIAS - The Global Jewish Nonprofit
International Rescue Committee
Lutheran Immigration and Refugee Service
U.S. Committee for Refugees and Immigrants
United States Conference of Catholic Bishops
World Relief

References

External links
ORR list of VOLAGs

Refugees in the United States
Refugee aid organizations in the United States